Longina is a genus of flies in the family Neriidae.

Species
Longina abdominalis Wiedemann, 1830
Longina anguliceps Buck & Marshall, 2004
Longina semialba Buck & Marshall, 2004

References

Brachycera genera
Neriidae
Taxa named by Christian Rudolph Wilhelm Wiedemann
Diptera of South America